The Brad is a right tributary of the river Crișul Alb in Romania. It discharges into the Crișul Alb in the city Brad.

References

Rivers of Romania
Rivers of Hunedoara County